José Martínez Llobet (1 May 1895 – 20 March 1971) was a Spanish rowing coxswain. He competed in the men's eight event at the 1924 Summer Olympics.

References

External links
 

1895 births
1971 deaths
Spanish male rowers
Olympic rowers of Spain
Rowers at the 1924 Summer Olympics
Rowers from Barcelona
Coxswains (rowing)